KC Lightfoot (born November 11, 1999, in Lee's Summit, Missouri) is an American athlete specializing in pole vault. KC cleared  at the Texas Tech Shootout on February 13, 2021, to set a new United States collegiate indoor pole vault record. He placed fourth at the 2020 Summer Olympics.

Competition record

US Track and field Championships

He finished third at the 2019 USA Outdoor Track and Field Championships with a personal best jump of 5.76 m.

References

Notes

External links
 
 
 
 KC Lightfoot profile at Baylor Bears
 
 KC Lightfoot results at Lee's Summit High School
 KC Lightfoot news at Vaulter Magazine
 

1999 births
Living people
American male pole vaulters
Olympic track and field athletes of the United States
Athletes (track and field) at the 2020 Summer Olympics
World Athletics Championships athletes for the United States
Baylor Bears men's track and field athletes
Track and field athletes from Missouri
People from Lee's Summit, Missouri